Dzherman may refer to:

 Dzherman (river), a river in south-western Bulgaria
 Dzherman, Kyustendil Province, a village in Dupnitsa Municipality, south-western Bulgaria

See also 
 German (disambiguation)